The 2003–04 NBA season was the Kings' 55th season in the National Basketball Association, and their 19th season in Sacramento. The season was best remembered for the team making a move in the offseason, acquiring Brad Miller from the Indiana Pacers and signing free agent Anthony Peeler. Superstar forward Chris Webber, who spent most of the season recovering from microfracture knee surgery, then serving a suspension due to the Ed Martin scandal, returned for the final 23 games of the season in which they played mediocre basketball the rest of the way.

Still, the Kings finished the season second in the Pacific Division with a 55–27 record. Miller and Peja Stojaković were both selected for the 2004 NBA All-Star Game. In the first round of the playoffs, the Kings got the last laugh as they defeated their archrivals the Dallas Mavericks in five games, before falling to Kevin Garnett and the Minnesota Timberwolves in the second round as Webber missed a potential game-tying 3-pointer in Game 7. This ended the Kings' attempt at a championship as their core would be dismantled the following season, which included Vlade Divac re-signing as a free agent with the Los Angeles Lakers, Peeler signing with the Washington Wizards, and Gerald Wallace leaving in the 2004 NBA Expansion Draft.

Offseason

Draft picks

The Kings had no draft picks in 2003.

Roster

Regular season

Season standings

z – clinched division title
y – clinched division title
x – clinched playoff spot

Record vs. opponents

Game log

|-style="background:#cfc;"
| 1
| October 29
| Cleveland
| 
| Peja Stojaković (22)
| Brad Miller (9)
| Mike Bibby (7)
| ARCO Arena17,317
| 1–0
|-style="background:#cfc;"
| 2
| October 31
| Philadelphia
| 
| Peja Stojaković (28)
| Brad Miller (9)
| Bibby, Miller (5)
| ARCO Arena17,317
| 2–0

|-style="background:#fcc;"
| 3
| November 1
| @ Denver
| 
| Peja Stojaković (19)
| Brad Miller (12)
| Mike Bibby (10)
| Pepsi Center18,111
| 2–1
|-style="background:#cfc;"
| 4
| November 5
| @ Minnesota
| 
| Peja Stojaković (34)
| Miller, Divac (8)
| Vlade Divac (10)
| Target Center15,889
| 3–1
|-style="background:#fcc;"
| 5
| November 7
| @ New York
| 
| Peja Stojaković (36)
| Vlade Divac (7)
| Doug Christie (9)
| Madison Square Garden19,333
| 3–2
|-style="background:#fcc;"
| 6
| November 9
| @ Boston
| 
| Brad Miller (19)
| Brad Miller (16)
| Mike Bibby (11)
| FleetCenter16,502
| 3–3
|-style="background:#cfc;"
| 7
| November 11
| Detroit
| 
| Mike Bibby (23)
| Peja Stojaković (10)
| Vlade Divac (9)
| ARCO Arena17,317
| 4–3
|-style="background:#fcc;"
| 8
| November 13
| @ Portland
| 
| Peja Stojaković (27)
| Miller, Massenburg (7)
| Mike Bibby (15)
| Rose Garden17,422
| 4–4
|-style="background:#cfc;"
| 9
| November 14
| Toronto
| 
| Peja Stojaković (17)
| Brad Miller (12)
| Divac, Jackson (6)
| ARCO Arena17,317
| 5–4
|-style="background:#cfc;"
| 10
| November 16
| Golden State
| 
| Peja Stojaković (33)
| Peja Stojaković (11)
| Brad Miller (11)
| ARCO Arena17,317
| 6–4
|-style="background:#cfc;"
| 11
| November 19
| @ Utah
| 
| Peja Stojaković (30)
| Brad Miller (13)
| Brad Miller (8)
| Delta Center17,664
| 7–4
|-style="background:#cfc;"
| 12
| November 21
| Orlando
| 
| Brad Miller (22)
| Brad Miller (14)
| Brad Miller (10)
| ARCO Arena17,317
| 8–4
|-style="background:#cfc;"
| 13
| November 23
| Chicago
| 
| Peja Stojaković (21)
| Brad Miller (10)
| Miller, Bibby (7)
| ARCO Arena17,317
| 9–4
|-style="background:#cfc;"
| 14
| November 25
| Memphis
| 
| Peja Stojaković (26)
| Peja Stojaković (9)
| Mike Bibby (6)
| ARCO Arena17,317
| 10–4
|-style="background:#cfc;"
| 15
| November 28
| Houston
| 
| Brad Miller (29)
| Miller, Christie (7)
| Bibby, Divac (6)
| ARCO Arena17,317
| 11–4
|-style="background:#cfc;"
| 16
| November 30
| New Jersey
| 
| Peja Stojaković (25)
| Brad Miller (11)
| Vlade Divac (8)
| ARCO Arena17,317
| 12–4

|-style="background:#fcc;"
| 17
| December 5
| Minnesota
| 
| Brad Miller (35)
| Peja Stojaković (11)
| Stojaković, Divac (4)
| ARCO Arena17,317
| 12–5
|-style="background:#cfc;"
| 18
| December 7
| Indiana
| 
| Peja Stojaković (27)
| Brad Miller (15)
| Brad Miller (10)
| ARCO Arena17,317
| 13–5
|-style="background:#cfc;"
| 19
| December 9
| L.A. Clippers
| 
| Peja Stojaković (26)
| Mike Bibby (7)
| Bibby, Divac (6)
| ARCO Arena17,317
| 14–5
|-style="background:#cfc;"
| 20
| December 12
| @ Utah
| 
| Mike Bibby (25)
| Stojaković, Miller (8)
| Vlade Divac (6)
| Delta Center19,678
| 15–5
|-style="background:#cfc;"
| 21
| December 14
| Phoenix
| 
| Peja Stojaković (36)
| Miller, Jackson (9)
| Mike Bibby (6)
| ARCO Arena17,317
| 16–5
|-style="background:#fcc;"
| 22
| December 16
| @ Memphis
| 
| Peja Stojaković (27)
| Brad Miller (16)
| Doug Christie (6)
| Pyramid Arena11,210
| 16–6
|-style="background:#cfc;"
| 23
| December 18
| @ New Orleans
| 
| Brad Miller (21)
| Brad Miller (14)
| Brad Miller (9)
| New Orleans Arena13,769
| 17–6
|-style="background:#cfc;"
| 24
| December 19
| @ Atlanta
| 
| Peja Stojaković (31)
| Brad Miller (12)
| Vlade Divac (8)
| Philips Arena11,666
| 18–6
|-style="background:#cfc;"
| 25
| December 21
| Portland
| 
| Peja Stojaković (29)
| Brad Miller (14)
| Bibby, Divac (7)
| ARCO Arena17,317
| 19–6
|-style="background:#cfc;"
| 26
| December 23
| Memphis
| 
| Peja Stojaković (41)
| Brad Miller (17)
| Brad Miller (6)
| ARCO Arena17,317
| 20–6
|-style="background:#fcc;"
| 27
| December 25
| Dallas
| 
| Mike Bibby (23)
| Brad Miller (12)
| Brad Miller (9)
| ARCO Arena17,317
| 20–7
|-style="background:#fcc;"
| 28
| December 26
| @ Golden State
| 
| Mike Bibby (28)
| Brad Miller (10)
| Doug Christie (7)
| The Arena in Oakland20,192
| 20–8
|-style="background:#cfc;"
| 29
| December 28
| Utah
| 
| Peja Stojaković (37)
| Doug Christie (9)
| Doug Christie (9)
| ARCO Arena17,317
| 21–8

|-style="background:#cfc;"
| 30
| January 3
| @ L.A. Clippers
| 
| Mike Bibby (24)
| Brad Miller (11)
| Doug Christie (10)
| Staples Center18,252
| 22–8
|-style="background:#cfc;"
| 31
| January 4
| Seattle
| 
| Peja Stojaković (24)
| Brad Miller (11)
| Doug Christie (8)
| ARCO Arena17,317
| 23–8
|-style="background:#cfc;"
| 32
| January 6
| Atlanta
| 
| Peja Stojaković (28)
| Brad Miller (10)
| Vlade Divac (10)
| ARCO Arena17,317
| 24–8
|-style="background:#fcc;"
| 33
| January 7
| @ Seattle
| 
| Stojaković, Bibby (19)
| Brad Miller (17)
| Mike Bibby (7)
| KeyArena15,035
| 24–9
|-style="background:#cfc;"
| 34
| January 9
| @ Phoenix
| 
| Peja Stojaković (29)
| Peja Stojaković (12)
| Mike Bibby (9)
| America West Arena16,848
| 25–9
|-style="background:#cfc;"
| 35
| January 11
| Denver
| 
| Peja Stojaković (33)
| Peja Stojaković (8)
| Vlade Divac (9)
| ARCO Arena17,317
| 26–9
|-style="background:#cfc;"
| 36
| January 13
| Miami
| 
| Peja Stojaković (24)
| Brad Miller (9)
| Brad Miller (7)
| ARCO Arena17,317
| 27–9
|-style="background:#cfc;"
| 37
| January 16
| L.A. Lakers
| 
| Peja Stojaković (23)
| Brad Miller (14)
| Vlade Divac (7)
| ARCO Arena17,317
| 28–9
|-style="background:#cfc;"
| 38
| January 19
| @ L.A. Clippers
| 
| Peja Stojaković (31)
| Brad Miller (8)
| Christie, Divac (8)
| Staples Center17,325
| 29–9
|-style="background:#fcc;"
| 39
| January 20
| Portland
| 
| Peja Stojaković (34)
| Bobby Jackson (10)
| Vlade Divac (7)
| ARCO Arena17,317
| 29–10
|-style="background:#cfc;"
| 40
| January 22
| @ Cleveland
| 
| Peja Stojaković (37)
| Brad Miller (15)
| Vlade Divac (9)
| Gund Arena17,720
| 30–10
|-style="background:#fcc;"
| 41
| January 23
| @ Memphis
| 
| Vlade Divac (17)
| Vlade Divac (12)
| Peja Stojaković (5)
| Pyramid Arena17,119
| 30–11
|-style="background:#fcc;"
| 42
| January 25
| @ Dallas
| 
| Peja Stojaković (24)
| Brad Miller (17)
| Mike Bibby (6)
| American Airlines Center20,284
| 30–12
|-style="background:#cfc;"
| 43
| January 28
| @ Houston
| 
| Mike Bibby (28)
| Peja Stojaković (9)
| Brad Miller (6)
| Toyota Center18,209
| 31–12
|-style="background:#cfc;"
| 44
| January 29
| @ San Antonio
| 
| Peja Stojaković (22)
| Vlade Divac (9)
| Vlade Divac (9)
| SBC Center17,669
| 32–12
|-style="background:#cfc;"
| 45
| January 31
| @ Seattle
| 
| Peja Stojaković (29)
| Brad Miller (17)
| Bibby, Peeler (5)
| KeyArena17,072
| 33–12

|-style="background:#cfc;"
| 46
| February 3
| Seattle
| 
| Peja Stojaković (26)
| Brad Miller (15)
| Vlade Divac (11)
| ARCO Arena17,317
| 34–12
|-style="background:#fcc;"
| 47
| February 6
| San Antonio
| 
| Stojaković, Divac, Bibby (20)
| Brad Miller (11)
| Mike Bibby (6)
| ARCO Arena17,317
| 34–13
|-style="background:#cfc;"
| 48
| February 8
| Denver
| 
| Peja Stojaković (35)
| Miller, Divac (10)
| Christie, Bibby (8)
| ARCO Arena17,317
| 35–13
|-style="background:#cfc;"
| 49
| February 10
| @ Milwaukee
| 
| Peja Stojaković (31)
| Brad Miller (8)
| Bibby, Divac (11)
| Bradley Center17,407
| 36–13
|-style="background:#cfc;"
| 50
| February 11
| @ Detroit
| 
| Mike Bibby (26)
| Brad Miller (15)
| Vlade Divac (11)
| The Palace of Auburn Hills22,076
| 37–13
|-style="background:#cfc;"
| 51
| February 17
| Boston
| 
| Peja Stojaković (28)
| Vlade Divac (11)
| Vlade Divac (11)
| ARCO Arena17,317
| 38–13
|-style="background:#fcc;"
| 52
| February 19
| @ Minnesota
| 
| Peja Stojaković (15)
| Vlade Divac (8)
| Mike Bibby (7)
| Target Center18,667
| 38–14
|-style="background:#cfc;"
| 53
| February 20
| @ Chicago
| 
| Peja Stojaković (24)
| Vlade Divac (11)
| Vlade Divac (11)
| United Center20,172
| 39–14
|-style="background:#cfc;"
| 54
| February 22
| @ Toronto
| 
| Peja Stojaković (27)
| Songaila, Massenburg (10)
| Vlade Divac (12)
| Air Canada Centre19,800
| 40–14
|-style="background:#cfc;"
| 55
| February 24
| New York
| 
| Mike Bibby (28)
| Darius Songaila (13)
| Vlade Divac (9)
| ARCO Arena17,317
| 41–14
|-style="background:#cfc;"
| 56
| February 26
| @ L.A. Lakers
| 
| Peja Stojaković (37)
| Peja Stojaković (9)
| Vlade Divac (10)
| Staples Center18,997
| 42–14
|-style="background:#fcc;"
| 57
| February 27
| Utah
| 
| Mike Bibby (26)
| Vlade Divac (8)
| Vlade Divac (7)
| ARCO Arena17,317
| 42–15
|-style="background:#cfc;"
| 58
| February 29
| Phoenix
| 
| Peja Stojaković (32)
| Brad Miller (10)
| Christie, Divac (9)
| ARCO Arena17,317
| 43–15

|-style="background:#cfc;"
| 59
| March 2
| L.A. Clippers
| 
| Chris Webber (26)
| Chris Weber (12)
| Vlade Divac (8)
| ARCO Arena17,317
| 44–15
|-style="background:#cfc;"
| 60
| March 4
| @ Philadelphia
| 
| Peja Stojaković (27)
| Brad Miller (7)
| Chris Webber (10)
| Wachovia Center18,798
| 45–15
|-style="background:#fcc;"
| 61
| March 6
| @ Miami
| 
| Mike Bibby (24)
| Brad Miller (11)
| Doug Christie (6)
| American Airlines Arena16,508
| 45–16
|-style="background:#cfc;"
| 62
| March 7
| @ Orlando
| 
| Peja Stojaković (28)
| Brad Miller (13)
| Doug Christie (12)
| TD Waterhouse Centre15,625
| 46–16
|-style="background:#cfc;"
| 63
| March 9
| Golden State
| 
| Doug Christie (23)
| Chris Webber (11)
| Doug Christie (6)
| ARCO Arena17,317
| 47–16
|-style="background:#cfc;"
| 64
| March 11
| Dallas
| 
| Christie, Stojaković (22)
| Chris Webber (8)
| Doug Christie (12)
| ARCO Arena17,317
| 48–16
|-style="background:#fcc;"
| 65
| March 12
| @ Portland
| 
| Peja Stojaković (18)
| Peja Stojaković (9)
| Mike Bibby (8)
| Rose Garden20,308
| 48–17
|-style="background:#cfc;"
| 66
| March 14
| San Antonio
| 
| Mike Bibby (24)
| Brad Miller (13)
| Chris Webber (5)
| ARCO Arena17,317
| 49–17
|-style="background:#fcc;"
| 67
| March 16
| @ New Jersey
| 
| Mike Bibby (17)
| Chris Webber (9)
| Mike Bibby (5)
| Continental Airlines Arena16,949
| 49–18
|-style="background:#fcc;"
| 68
| March 17
| @ Washington
| 
| Peja Stojaković (25)
| Brad Miller (8)
| Doug Christie (7)
| MCI Center15,255
| 49–19
|-style="background:#cfc;"
| 69
| March 19
| @ Indiana
| 
| Mike Bibby (25)
| Chris Webber (16)
| Chris Webber (8)
| Conseco Fieldhouse18,345
| 50–19
|-style="background:#cfc;"
| 70
| March 21
| Houston
| 
| Peja Stojaković (29)
| Chris Webber (15)
| Mike Bibby (7)
| ARCO Arena17,317
| 51–19
|-style="background:#fcc;"
| 71
| March 23
| Milwaukee
| 
| Mike Bibby (27)
| Chris Webber (10)
| Chris Webber (8)
| ARCO Arena17,317
| 51–20
|-style="background:#fcc;"
| 72
| March 24
| @ L.A. Lakers
| 
| Peja Stojaković (20)
| Peja Stojaković (8)
| Mike Bibby (6)
| Staples Center18,997
| 51–21
|-style="background:#cfc;"
| 73
| March 28
| Washington
| 
| Peja Stojaković (29)
| Peja Stojaković (11)
| Bibby, Webber (7)
| ARCO Arena17,317
| 52–21
|-style="background:#fcc;"
| 74
| March 31
| @ San Antonio
| 
| Peja Stojaković (19)
| Darius Songaila (9)
| Chirs Webber (6)
| SBC Center18,797
| 52–22

|-style="background:#fcc;"
| 75
| April 1
| @ Dallas
| 
| Mike Bibby (23)
| Chris Webber (11)
| Doug Christie (9)
| American Airlines Center20,533
| 52–23
|-style="background:#cfc;"
| 76
| April 4
| @ Houston
| 
| Peja Stojaković (28)
| Peja Stojaković (11)
| Webber, Christie, Divac (6)
| Toyota Center18,148
| 53–23
|-style="background:#cfc;"
| 77
| April 6
| New Orleans
| 
| Peja Stojaković (26)
| Brad Miller (10)
| Chris Webber (6)
| ARCO Arena17,317
| 54–23
|-style="background:#fcc;"
| 78
| April 8
| Minnesota
| 
| Chris Webber (21)
| Chris Webber (11)
| Mike Bibby (7)
| ARCO Aena17,317
| 54–24
|-style="background:#fcc;"
| 79
| April 9
| @ Phoenix
| 
| Mike Bibby (26)
| Brad Miller (15)
| Brad Miller (6)
| America West Arena18,422
| 54–25
|-style="background:#cfc;"
| 80
| April 11
| L.A. Lakers
| 
| Chris Webber (25)
| Chris Webber (12)
| Mike Bibby (8)
| ARCO Arena17,317
| 55–25
|-style="background:#fcc;"
| 81
| April 12
| @ Denver
| 
| Peja Stojaković (20)
| Brad Miller (8)
| Doug Christie (8)
| Pepsi Center19,746
| 55–26
|-style="background:#fcc;"
| 82
| April 14
| @ Golden State
| 
| Peja Stojaković (27)
| Brad Miller (11)
| Brad Miller (7)
| The Arena in Oakland19,831
| 55–27

Playoffs
Sacramento's win over Dallas is their most recent playoff series victory to date; in fact, the Kings haven't even qualified for the NBA playoffs at all since 2006.

|- align="center" bgcolor="#ccffcc"
| 1
| April 18
| Dallas
| W 116–105
| Peja Stojaković (28)
| Chris Webber (12)
| Doug Christie (11)
| ARCO Arena17,317
| 1–0
|- align="center" bgcolor="#ccffcc"
| 2
| April 20
| Dallas
| W 83–79
| Mike Bibby (24)
| Chris Webber (13)
| Chris Webber (12)
| ARCO Arena17,317
| 2–0
|- align="center" bgcolor="#ffcccc"
| 3
| April 24
| @ Dallas
| L 79–104
| Bibby, Webber (22)
| Peja Stojaković (8)
| Doug Christie (4)
| American Airlines Center20,580
| 2–1
|- align="center" bgcolor="#ccffcc"
| 4
| April 26
| @ Dallas
| W 94–92
| Mike Bibby (22)
| Brad Miller (16)
| three players tied (5)
| American Airlines Center20,677
| 3–1
|- align="center" bgcolor="#ccffcc"
| 5
| April 29
| Dallas
| W 119–118
| Mike Bibby (36)
| Peja Stojaković (10)
| Bibby, Christie (8)
| ARCO Arena17,317
| 4–1
|-

|- align="center" bgcolor="#ccffcc"
| 1
| May 4
| @ Minnesota
| W 104–98
| Mike Bibby (33)
| Brad Miller (10)
| Mike Bibby (7)
| Target Center18,792
| 1–0
|- align="center" bgcolor="#ffcccc"
| 2
| May 8
| @ Minnesota
| L 89–94
| Peja Stojaković (26)
| Brad Miller (11)
| Mike Bibby (8)
| Target Center19,599
| 1–1
|- align="center" bgcolor="#ffcccc"
| 3
| May 10
| Minnesota
| L 113–114 (OT)
| Peja Stojaković (29)
| Doug Christie (12)
| Mike Bibby (10)
| ARCO Arena17,317
| 1–2
|- align="center" bgcolor="#ccffcc"
| 4
| May 12
| Minnesota
| W 87–81
| Chris Webber (28)
| Chris Webber (8)
| Mike Bibby (12)
| ARCO Arena17,317
| 2–2
|- align="center" bgcolor="#ffcccc"
| 5
| May 14
| @ Minnesota
| L 74–86
| Mike Bibby (14)
| Brad Miller (10)
| Mike Bibby (6)
| Target Center19,318
| 2–3
|- align="center" bgcolor="#ccffcc"
| 6
| May 16
| Minnesota
| W 104–87
| Peja Stojaković (22)
| Peja Stojaković (8)
| Mike Bibby (10)
| ARCO Arena17,317
| 3–3
|- align="center" bgcolor="#ffcccc"
| 7
| May 19
| @ Minnesota
| L 80–83
| Doug Christie (21)
| three players tied (8)
| Mike Bibby (8)
| Target Center19,944
| 3–4
|-

Player statistics

Season

Playoffs

Awards and records

Transactions

References

See also
 2003–04 NBA season

Sacramento Kings seasons
Sacramento
Sacramento
Sacramento